Minnesota State Highway 111 (MN 111) is a short  highway in south-central Minnesota, which runs from its intersection with U.S. Highway 14 in Nicollet and continues north to its northern terminus at its intersection with State Highway 22 in New Sweden Township.

Route description
Highway 111 serves as a north–south route in south-central Minnesota between the cities of Nicollet and Gaylord.

Highway 111 is also known as Main Street in the city of Nicollet.

The route is legally defined as Route 122 in the Minnesota Statutes. It is not marked with this number.

History
Highway 111 was authorized on April 22, 1933.

The route was paved by 1942.

Major intersections

References

111
Transportation in Nicollet County, Minnesota